The Slovak passport is issued to citizens of Slovakia to enable legal international travel. Every Slovak citizen is also a citizen of the European Union. The passport, along with the national identity card allows for free rights of movement and residence in any of the states of the European Economic Area and Switzerland.

Every Slovak citizen is entitled to possess two passports of the same kind, if so desired. The second passport is valid for 5 years (instead of the standard 10 years), while the fee remains the same. Passports in Slovakia are issued by the police force.

History 
Slovakia started issuing the current biometric passports on 15 January 2008. The biometric data consisted of the face picture. On 22 June 2009 the passports were changed to include second biometric data of the fingerprints. Because of the nature of biometric data acquirement, passports are now issued only directly to the passport owners.

Visa requirements

As of 1 October 2019 Slovak citizens had visa-free or visa on arrival access to 181 countries and territories, ranking the Slovak passport 9th in terms of travel freedom (tied with Australian and Lithuanian passports) according to the Henley Passport Index.

Gallery of historic images

See also 
 Visa requirements for Slovak citizens
 Passports of the European Union

References

External links 

 Official passport specimen photo gallery
  Photo gallery of the new Slovak biometric passport

Foreign relations of Slovakia
Passports by country
European Union passports